Danuta Nowicka (born 20 July 1951) is a Polish politician. She was elected to the Sejm (9th term) representing the constituency of Katowice III. She previously also served in the 8th term of the Sejm (2015–2019).

References 

Living people
1951 births
Place of birth missing (living people)
21st-century Polish politicians
21st-century Polish women politicians
Members of the Polish Sejm 2015–2019
Members of the Polish Sejm 2019–2023
Women members of the Sejm of the Republic of Poland